Nepal Ratna Girija Prasad Koirala (4 July 1924 – 20 March 2010), affectionately known as Girija Babu, was a Nepalese politician. He headed the Nepali Congress and served as the Prime Minister of Nepal on four occasions, including from 1991 to 1994, 1998 to 1999, 2000 to 2001, and from 2006 to 2008. He was the Acting Head of State of Nepal between January 2007 and July 2008 as the country transitioned from a monarchy to a republic.

Koirala, who was active in politics for over sixty years, was a pioneer of the Nepalese labour movement, having started the first political workers' movement on Nepalese soil, known as the Biratnagar jute mill strike in his hometown, Biratnagar. In 1991 he became the first democratically elected Prime Minister since 1959, when his brother B.P. Koirala and the Nepali Congress party were swept into power in the country's first democratic election.

Personal life

Koirala was born in Saharsa, Bihar, British India, in 1924 into a Hill Brahmin family. His father, Krishna Prasad Koirala, was a Nepali living in exile. In 1952 Koirala married Sushma Koirala, headmistress at the local school for women in Biratnagar. Their daughter Sujata Koirala was born in 1953. Sushma died in a kerosene stove explosion in 1967. He along with his daughter Sujata were followers of the Indian spiritual leader Sathya Sai Baba.

Koirala belonged to one of Nepal's most prominent political families. Two of his brothers were prime ministers: Matrika Prasad Koirala from 1951 to 1952 and 1953 to 1955, and Bisheshwar Prasad Koirala from 1959 until King Mahendra took over the government in December 1960. Bisheshwar Prasad and Girija Prasad were arrested and later sent to prison. With other leaders of the Nepali Congress Party (NCP), Girija Prasad went into exile after his release in 1967 and didn't return to Nepal until 1979.

Political career
Koirala became involved in politics in 1947, leading the Biratnagar jute mill strike In 1948 Koirala founded the Nepal Mazdoor Congress, later known as the Nepal Trade Union Congress-Independent. Later, in 1952, he became the President of the Morang District Nepali Congress and held that office until he was arrested and imprisoned by King Mahendra following the 1960 royal coup. Upon his release in 1967, Koirala, along with other leaders and workers of the party, was exiled to India until his return to Nepal in 1979. Koirala was General Secretary of the Nepali Congress Party from 1975 to 1991. Koirala was actively involved in the 1990 Jana Andolan which led to the abrogation of the Panchayat rule and the introduction of multiparty politics into the country. He had signed on many treaties which are against nation.

First term
In Nepal's first multiparty democratic election in 1991, Koirala was elected as a member of parliament from the Morang-1 and Sunsari-5 constituencies. The Nepali Congress won 110 of the 205 seats in the Pratinidhi Sabha (House of Representatives), the lower house of parliament. He was subsequently elected as the leader of the Nepali Congress parliamentary party and was appointed as Prime Minister by King Birendra.

During his first term, the House of Representatives enacted legislation to liberalize education, media and health sectors in the country. The government also founded the Purbanchal University and the B.P. Koirala Institute of Health Sciences(BPKIHS) in the Eastern Development Region and granted licenses to the private sector to run medical and engineering colleges in various parts of the country. The government also undertook the construction of the B.P. Koirala Memorial Cancer Hospital in Bharatpur, Nepal with assistance from the government of China. In November 1994, he called for a dissolution of parliament and general elections after a procedural defeat on the floor of the House when 36 members of parliament (MPs) of his party went against a government-sponsored vote of confidence. This led to the Communist Party of Nepal (Unified Marxist–Leninist)-led coalition coming to power in the elections that followed.

Second term
Koirala took over as Prime Minister from Surya Bahadur Thapa following the collapse of the coalition government led by Thapa. Koirala first headed a Nepali Congress minority government until 25 December 1998, after which he headed a three-party coalition government with the Communist Party of Nepal (UML) and the Nepal Sadbhawana Party.

Third term

Koirala became Prime Minister in 2000 for his third term following the resignation of Krishna Prasad Bhattarai, under whose leadership the Nepali Congress Party had won the parliamentary election. The party had won claiming that Krishna Prasad Bhattarai would be the Prime Minister, but Koirala led a group of dissident MPs and forced Bhattarai to resign or face a no-confidence motion. At that time Nepal was fighting a civil war against the Communist Party of Nepal (Maoist). Koirala resigned in July 2001 after which the military was mobilized in the civil war for the first time, something Koirala had unsuccessfully attempted to do while in office. He was replaced by former Prime Minister Sher Bahadur Deuba, who was elected by a majority of members of the NepalAfter the Loktantra Andolan and the reinstatement of the Nepal House of Representatives, Pratinidhi Sabha, on 24 April 2006, Koirala was selected to become Prime Minister by the leaders of the Seven Party Alliance. The reinstated House of Representatives passed laws to strip the King of his powers and bring the Army under civilian control. Following the promulgation of the interim constitution, Koirala, as the Prime Minister, became the interim head of state of Nepal.

On 1 April 2007, Koirala was re-elected as Prime Minister to head a new government composed of the SPA and the CPN (Maoist). Following the April 2008 Constituent Assembly election, the Constituent Assembly voted to declare Nepal a republic on 28 May 2008. Koirala, speaking to the Constituent Assembly shortly before the vote, said that "we have a big responsibility now"; he said that Nepal was entering a "new era" and that "the nation's dream has come true".

Fifth term

Girija Prasad Koirala continued again as the prime minister of Nepal for a fifth term. In the discussions on power-sharing that followed the declaration of a republic, the Nepali Congress proposed that Koirala become the first President of Nepal; however, the CPN (Maoist), which had emerged as the strongest party in the Constituent Assembly election, opposed this.

At a meeting of the Constituent Assembly on 26 June 2008, Koirala announced his resignation, although it would not be finalized until after the election of a President, to whom the resignation had to be submitted.

Koirala was present for the swearing in of Ram Baran Yadav, the first President of Nepal, on 23 July 2008. He submitted his resignation to Yadav later on the same day. CPN (M) Chairman Prachanda was elected by the Constituent Assembly to succeed Koirala on 15 August 2008; Koirala congratulated Prachanda on this occasion.

Later activity
Towards the end of his life, Koirala was leading a democratic front composed of parties that supported and promoted liberal democratic principles and aspired to establishment of a long-term democratic form of governance in Nepal.

Koirala wrote Simple Convictions: My Struggle for Peace and Democracy

Death

Koirala died at his daughter's home on 20 March 2010 at the age of 85, having suffered from asthma and pulmonary disease. His funeral was held at Pashupatinath Temple in Kathmandu on 21 March. Upon receiving news of his death, numerous politicians released statements of condolence. The Hindu described him as a "national guardian". Indian Prime Minister Manmohan Singh released a statement expressing his condolences, saying "Koirala was a mass leader and a statesman, whose knowledge and wisdom guided the polity of Nepal in the right direction at critical junctures in the country's history," while Ban Ki-moon, Secretary-General of the United Nations said "Koirala fought fearlessly and at considerable personal sacrifice for justice and democratic rights in his country" and senior Maoist politician Baburam Bhattarai said "Koirala will be very much missed, especially now that the country is nearing the end of the peace process that he facilitated".

Awards
On 2015, he was posthumously awarded with Nepal Ratna Man Padavi, the highest honour to a Nepali citizen by the Government of Nepal.
 Bangladesh :
 Bangladesh Liberation War Honour

See also
Biratnagar jute mill strike
Bishweshwar Prasad Koirala
List of prime ministers of Nepal

References

External links

|-

|-

|-

|-

|-

1924 births
2010 deaths
Deaths from multiple organ failure
Followers of Sathya Sai Baba
Nepalese exiles
Nepalese Hindus
Nepalese prisoners and detainees
Prime ministers of Nepal
Finance ministers of Nepal
Prisoners and detainees of Nepal
Kirori Mal College alumni
Heads of state of Nepal
Nepali Congress politicians from Koshi Province
Delhi University alumni
People from Biratnagar
People educated at Adarsha High School
G
Nepal MPs 1991–1994
Nepal MPs 1994–1999
Nepal MPs 1999–2002
People of the Nepalese Civil War
20th-century prime ministers of Nepal
21st-century prime ministers of Nepal
Bahun
Khas people
Members of the 1st Nepalese Constituent Assembly